Yudi may refer to:

Jade Emperor, a god in Chinese culture
Yudi Township, a township in Youyang County, Chongqing, China
Yudi language, a variety of Arabic spoken by Jews formerly living in Libya

See also  
Yu Di (died 818), Tang dynasty general and official